The Treasons Act 1571 (13 Eliz.1 c.1) was an Act of the Parliament of England during the reign of Queen Elizabeth I. It restored the provisions of the Treasons Act 1534, which had been passed by Parliament during the reign of her father, King Henry VIII, and then repealed by the Treason Act 1547 at the beginning of the reign of her half-brother, King Edward VI.

The Act 
It became high treason to intend bodily harm to the Queen, or to levy war against her, or incite others to levy war against her, or to say that she ought not to enjoy the Crown, or publish in writing that she is a heretic, tyrant or usurper, or to claim a right to the Crown or usurp it during the Queen's life, or to assert that somebody else has the right of succession to the throne, or to say that the laws enacted by Parliament do not govern the succession to the throne.

Legacy 
The Act was repealed on 28 July 1863 by the Statute Law Revision Act 1863. However until 1967 it remained treason under the Succession to the Crown Act 1707 to say that Parliament could not control the succession to the Crown.

Some of the wording of section V. of the Treasons Act of 1571 has drawn attention for its description of the legal line of succession. In the twenty-first century, academic scholarship and proponents of the Oxfordian theory of Shakespearean authorship noted the departure of the terms "heirs of the body" to the introduction of the phrase "natural issue" to refer to the line of succession, or Queen's heir to the throne:

Proponents contend this wording meant that any illegitimate child, or "natural issue", born to Queen Elizabeth I, would then be legal successor to the monarchy. As of 2016, scholarship continues to debate the implications of the change in the legal language, but agree its inclusion in the Act was meant to prevent a crisis of succession.

See also
High treason in the United Kingdom
Treason Act
Succession to the British throne
Oxfordian theory of Shakespeare authorship

References

External links
Treasons Act 1570, Danby Pickering, The Statutes at Large, 1763, vol. 6, pp. 257 (from Google Book Search)
Regnier, Thomas. "Did Tudor Succession Law Permit Royal Bastards to Inherit the Crown?"  2012-2013. Brief Chronicles IV.  pp. 39–58.
Tanner, J.D. Tudor Constitutional Documents, A.D. 1485-1603.  1922.  University of Cambridge Press, London.  pp. 413–417.  Internet Archive, 

1570 in law
1570 in England
Acts of the Parliament of England (1485–1603)
Treason in England